"How Long Is the Coast of Britain? Statistical Self-Similarity and Fractional Dimension" is a paper by mathematician Benoit Mandelbrot, first published in Science on 5 May 1967. In this paper, Mandelbrot discusses self-similar curves that have Hausdorff dimension between 1 and 2. These curves are examples of fractals, although Mandelbrot does not use this term in the paper, as he did not coin it until 1975. The paper is one of Mandelbrot's first publications on the topic of fractals.

Overview
The paper examines the coastline paradox: the property that the measured length of a stretch of coastline depends on the scale of measurement. Empirical evidence suggests that the smaller the increment of measurement, the longer the measured length becomes. If one were to measure a stretch of coastline with a yardstick, one would get a shorter result than if the same stretch were measured with a  ruler. This is because one would be laying the ruler along a more curvilinear route than that followed by the yardstick. The empirical evidence suggests a rule which, if extrapolated, shows that the measured length increases without limit as the measurement scale decreases towards zero.

This discussion implies that it is meaningless to talk about the length of a coastline; some other means of quantifying coastlines are needed. Mandelbrot discusses an empirical law discovered by Lewis Fry Richardson, who observed that the measured length L(G) of various geographic borders was a fractal curve of the measurement scale G. Collecting data from several different examples, Richardson conjectured that L(G) could be closely approximated by a function of the form

where M is a positive constant and D is a constant, called the dimension, greater than or equal to 1. Intuitively, if a coastline looks smooth it should have dimension close to 1; and the more irregular the coastline looks the closer its dimension should be to 2. The examples in Richardson's research have dimensions ranging from 1.02 for the coastline of South Africa to 1.25 for the West coast of Britain. 

Mandelbrot then describes various mathematical curves, related to the Koch snowflake, which are defined in such a way that they are strictly self-similar. Mandelbrot shows how to calculate the Hausdorff dimension of each of these curves, each of which has a dimension D between 1 and 2 (he also mentions but does not give a construction for the space-filling Peano curve, which has a dimension exactly 2). He notes that the approximation of these curves with segments of length G have lengths of the form . The resemblance with Richardson's law is striking. The paper does not claim that any coastline or geographic border actually has fractional dimension. Instead, it notes that Richardson's empirical law is compatible with the idea that geographic curves, such as coastlines, can be modelled by random self-similar figures of fractional dimension.

Near the end of the paper Mandelbrot briefly discusses how one might approach the study of fractal-like objects in nature that look random rather than regular. For this he defines statistically self-similar figures and says that these are encountered in nature.

The paper is important because it is a "turning point" in Mandelbrot's early thinking on fractals. It is an example of the linking of mathematical objects with natural forms that was a theme of much of his later work.

See also
 Coastline paradox
 List of countries by length of coastline

References

Mathematics papers
Works originally published in Science (journal)
Fractals